Development of solar power in Greece started in 2006 and installations of photovoltaic systems skyrocketed from 2009 because of the appealing feed-in tariffs introduced and the corresponding regulations for domestic applications of rooftop solar PV. In 2019, 90% of the ca. 2.5 GWp capacity was installed in 2011, 2012 and 2013. However, funding the FITs created an unacceptable deficit of more than €500 million in the Greek "Operator of Electricity Market" RES fund. To reduce that deficit, new regulations were introduced in August 2012 including retrospective feed-in tariffs reduction, with further reductions over time. These measures enabled the deficit to be erased by 2017.

Auctions have replaced FITs and after stagnating since 2013, as of 2019 Greece is again installing hundreds of MWp per year. By May 2022, the installed capacity of Photovoltaic systems, in the interconnected grid, has reached a total installed capacity of 4199 MWp for large parks. Moreover, anothe 352 MWp of rooftop - photovoltaic systems with a net power output of less than 10 kWp are also installed by this date. 

By April 2015, the total installed photovoltaic capacity in Greece had reached 2,442.6 MWp from which 350.5 MWp were installed on rooftops and the rest were ground mounted.  Greece ranks 5th worldwide with regard to per capita installed PV capacity and  PV covers 7% of the country's electricity demand in 2019.

List of power stations

Current

Future

See also 

 Renewable energy in Greece
 Wind power in Greece
 Desertec
 Solar power
 Solar power in the European Union
 Solar power by country
 Renewable energy by country

References